Stigmella xystodes is a moth of the family Nepticulidae first described by Edward Meyrick in 1916. It is found from the Oriental region to the Near East, North Africa and the Canary Islands.

The wingspan is 4.9–6.6 mm for males and 5–5.5 mm for females. Adults are on wing from July to August in the orient.

The larvae feed on Cyperus rotundus and probably Cyperus conglomeratus. They mine the leaves of their host plant. The mine starts either from the apex or middle of the leaf. The larva mines down for some length and then takes a turn and mines up, the second portion being exactly parallel to the first. The frass is deposited in a line in the centre all along the mine. Pupation takes place in a flat, golden-yellow oval cocoon. The larva is yellow and transparent with a brown head.

Original description

External links
Fauna Europaea
Meyrick, Edward (1916–1923). ''Exotic Microlepidoptera. 2 (1): 6.
Nepticulidae and Opostegidae of the World

Nepticulidae
Moths of Africa
Moths of Asia
Moths described in 1916